Haji Amir Bux Junejo (24 December 1916 – 7 October 2011) was a Pakistani politician who was elected four times member in Provisional Assembly, Sindh. He was famously known as "Otaqi Wadero" of Sindh whose guest house was open to all and sundry where they were fed round the clock.

Early life
Junejowas the only son of Imam Bux Khan Junejo, Born on 24 December 1916 in Khanpur, 1916 in Khanpur, Junejo passed primary education in 1927 in Khanpur primary School, He passed Sindhi Final in 1939 in Govt. High School Boriri. He recruited to Police in 1941 as Sobedar (Inspector). He resigned in 1946 and joined independence struggle by the Muslim League.

Political career
In the 1970s he joined PPP and was elected MPA on the party ticket three times in 1970, 1988 and 1990. Junejo took part in the Movement for Restoration of Democracy in 1983 and was sent to jail for six months.

In the General Election of 1970 He was the highest vote achiever in numbers on MPA seat in East & West Pakistan, BBC broadcast that news.
He was considered to be the closed companion of Zulfiqar Ali Bhutto and Benazir Bhutto.

He left PPP and joined PML in 1993 and was again elected MPA in 1997. After the assassination of Benazir Bhutto, he stopped running for MPA and later rejoined PPP.

Social work 
He was famous in the area for his generosity and it was known to everybody that his guest house was the ultimate place where all weary travelers and the destitute and the hungry could have food and shelter and a lot of kindness.

Haji Amir Bux Junejo provided a three-time meal to hundreds of people daily. He was very kind to the poor and he used to provide grain to the poor for the entire family during wheat harvest season.

Late Junejo had allocated income from 500 acres of his farmland to feed the hungry and his guests. Hundreds of people used to visit his Otaq daily to have food.

Death 
He died on 7 October 2011 at his Hyderabad residence in Qasimabad.
He is survived by three sons and seven daughters.

Funeral and burial 
Late Junejo was laid to rest at Jamia Masjid Ali Bux Junejo in Kakar town and his funeral prayer was held in Ali Bux Junejo village. Funeral Pryer was performed by Syed Hussain Shah of Qamber Shareef, Awami Ittehad Party chairman Liaquat Ali Jatoi, former MPA Sadaqat Ali Jatoi and Pir of Ranipur Roshan Ali Shah were also among those who attended his funeral prayer.

Publications on Amir Bux Junejo 
 Insaniyat Jo Khidmatgaar (Servant of Humanity) By: Pavel Junejo & Najam Junejo
 Article by Daily Ibrat
 Article in Sunday Magazine of Awami Awaz
 News by Daily Sindh
 Article by Mukhtiar Chandio

See also
 Junejo
 Dadu District
 Mohammad Khan Junejo
 Jam Sadiq Ali
 Liaquat Ali Jatoi

References

External links
 
 
 
 
 History of Junejo's

1916 births
2011 deaths
Sindhi people
People from Dadu District